The following is a list of episodes from the American television series Sex and the City.

For the sequel series see And Just Like That…

Series overview

Episodes

Season 1 (1998)

Season 2 (1999)

Season 3 (2000)

Season 4 (2001–02)

Season 5 (2002)

Season 6 (2003–04)

Films (2008–2010)

References

Lists of American comedy-drama television series episodes
Lists of American romance television series episodes
Lists of American sitcom episodes
•E